Cow head may refer to the head of a cow, or to a head (individual animal) of cattle. It may also refer to:
 Cow Head (town), a town in the Canadian province of Newfoundland and Labrador
 Cow Head Group, a geologic group in Newfoundland and Labrador
 Cow head protests, which occurred in Selangor, Malaysia in 2009
 Gozu ("Cow Head"), a Japanese urban legend
 Gozu, or Yakuza Horror Theatre: Cow's Head, a 2003 Japanese film directed by Takashi Miike
 Ox-Head and Horse-Face, characters in Chinese mythology
 Álvar Núñez Cabeza de Vaca, explorer whose Spanish surname means "cow head"